Jurijs Žigajevs (born 14 November 1985) is a Latvian former football player who made 31 appearances for the Latvia national team.

Club career

Born in the then Leningrad, Russia Žigajevs moved to Latvia at a young age. In his youth he played for FK Ilūkste and later FK Zibens Zemessardze. In 2002, he signed a professional contract with FK Rīga, playing in the Latvian Higher League. He played there for 6 years, until 2008, making 118 appearances and scoring 17 goals. After, the club's bankrupt Žigajevs signed a contract with another Latvian Higher League club FK Ventspils. He spent 2 seasons there, playing 46 matches and scoring 24 goals. On December 3, 2010 Žigajevs joined the Polish Ekstraklasa club Widzew Łódź. Struggling with injuries all season Žigajevs made only 5 league appearances for the Polish side and in June 2012 re-joined his former club FK Ventspils.

International career 

Žigajevs made his international debut for Latvia on 13 October 2007 in a 2-4 win against Iceland. He collected 31 caps and scored 2 goals. He scored his first goal in the 2010 FIFA World Cup qualification match victory against Luxembourg.

Position 

Žigajevs is commonly played out as a right winger.

International goals

References

External links 

 
 Jurijs Žigajevs player info 
 

1985 births
Living people
Latvian footballers
Latvia international footballers
Latvian people of Russian descent
FK Rīga players
FK Ventspils players
Widzew Łódź players
FK Spartaks Jūrmala players
Association football wingers
Expatriate footballers in Poland
Latvian expatriate sportspeople in Poland
Latvian expatriate footballers
Ekstraklasa players
Ilūkstes NSS players